The 1912 United States presidential election in Michigan took place on November 5, 1912, as part of the 1912 United States presidential election. Voters chose 15 representatives, or electors, to the Electoral College, who voted for president and vice president.

Michigan was won by the 26th president of the United States Theodore Roosevelt (P–New York), running with governor of California Hiram Johnson, with 38.95% of the popular vote, against the 27th president of the United States William Howard Taft (R–Ohio), running with Columbia University President Nicholas Murray Butler, with 27.63% of the popular vote and Princeton University President Woodrow Wilson (D–Virginia), running with governor of Indiana Thomas R. Marshall, with 27.36% of the popular vote.

Michigan was one only two states where Democratic candidate Woodrow Wilson came in third behind former president of the United States Theodore Roosevelt and the current president of the United States William Howard Taft - the only other such state being Vermont where Wilson finished a much more distant third. Since 1912 there has been only one occasion (Bill Clinton in Utah in 1992) where a winning presidential candidate finished third in any non-Confederate state. , this is the last election in which Ottawa County, Sanilac County, and Missaukee County did not support the Republican candidate. This was the first time since 1852 that Michigan voted for a non-Republican presidential candidate, and the only time Michigan ever voted for a third-party presidential candidate.

With 38.95% of the popular vote, Michigan would prove to be Roosevelt's third-strongest state in terms of popular vote percentage in the 1912 election after South Dakota and California.

Results

Results by county

See also
 United States presidential elections in Michigan

Notes

References

Michigan
1912
1912 Michigan elections